Bauch und Kopf is the second studio album by German recording artist Mark Forster. It was released by Four Music on 16 May 2014 in German-speaking Europe.

Track listing

Charts

Weekly charts

Year-end charts

Certifications

Release history

References

External links
 MarkForster.de — official site

2014 albums
Mark Forster (singer) albums